is a private university in Takamatsu, Kagawa Prefecture, Japan, established in 1996. The operator of the school also runs Takamatsu Junior College.

External links
Official website 

Educational institutions established in 1996
Private universities and colleges in Japan
Universities and colleges in Kagawa Prefecture
Japanese junior colleges
1996 establishments in Japan
Takamatsu, Kagawa